Arthur Pue Gorman (1839–1906) was a U.S. Senator from Maryland from 1881 to 1899 and from 1903 to 1906. Senator Gorman may also refer

Lee A. Gorman (1895–?), Michigan State Senate
Pamela Gorman (fl. 2000s–2010s), Arizona State Senate
James S. Gorman (1850–1923), Michigan State Senate

See also
Senator Gorham (disambiguation)